This is a list of public art in Terre Haute, Indiana, and the surrounding area of Vigo County, Indiana.

This list applies only to works of public art accessible in an outdoor public space. For example, this does not include artwork visible inside a museum.

Most of the works mentioned are sculptures. When this is not the case (i.e. sound installation, for example) it is stated next to the title.

Terre Haute

References

Buildings and structures in Terre Haute, Indiana
Terre Haute
Outdoor sculptures in Indiana
Tourist attractions in Terre Haute, Indiana
Terre Haute